Miiko Hintz (born September 27, 1992) is a Finnish ice hockey player.

Hintz made his SM-liiga debut playing with Ilves during the 2011–12 SM-liiga season.

References

External links

1992 births
Living people
Finnish ice hockey right wingers
HC Keski-Uusimaa players
Hokki players
Ilves players
Lempäälän Kisa players
People from Nokia, Finland
SaPKo players
Sportspeople from Pirkanmaa